Kadamtole Krishna Nache (Assamese:  কদমতলে কৃষ্ণ নাচে) is an Assamese drama film directed by Suman Haripriya. This film was released on 2 September 2005. This film was awarded as Best Assamese Film in 53rd National Film Awards.

Plot

Cast 
 Aimee Baruah
 Saurabh Hazarika
 Tapan Das
 Jayanta Bhagabati
 Runu Devi
 Rupsikha

References

External links 
 

2005 films
Best Assamese Feature Film National Film Award winners
2000s Assamese-language films